Bifidobacterium thermacidophilum is a Gram-positive, rod-shaped species of bacteria. Strains of this species were originally isolated from an anaerobic digester used to treat wastewater from a tofu farm. The species is thermophilic and can grow at a temperature of 49.5 °C.

Strains of B. thermacidophilum have been experimentally used as probiotics. It was effective in reducing damage to the gut in a mouse model of E. coli infection.

B. thermacidophilum has been divided into two subspecies: subsp. Porcinum and subsp. Thermacidophilum.

References

External links
Type strain of Bartonella thermacidophilum at BacDive -  the Bacterial Diversity Metadatabase

Bifidobacteriales
Bacteria described in 2000